Elachista albidella is a moth of the family Elachistidae, described by William Nylander in 1848. Its wingspan ranges from .The head is white. Forewings are white, costa and sometimes dorsum suffused with fuscous; plical stigma large, elongate, black ; an angulated fuscous fascia beyond middle, angle acutely produced towards apex ; small fuscous costal and dorsal spots near apex. Hindwings are rather dark grey.The larva is greenish-grey, more yellowish anteriorly; head dark brown.
 
Elachista albidella is found from Fennoscandia and northern Russia to the Pyrenees, Italy and Hungary and from Ireland to Ukraine. It is also found in North America.

The larvae feed on Calamagrostis arundinacea, Carex acuta, Carex acutiformis, Carex riparia, Deschampsia cespitosa, Deschampsia flexuosa, Eleocharis palustris, Eriophorum angustifolium, Melica nutans, Poa palustris and Scirpus caespitosus.

References

External links
Lepidoptera of Sweden
bladmineerders.nl
Moth Photographers Group

albidella
Moths described in 1848
Moths of Europe
Moths of North America
Taxa named by William Nylander (botanist)